Ruben Ramos (born 1940) is an American musician.

Ruben Ramos may also refer to:
Ruben Ramos (politician) (born 1973), American politician
Rubén Ramos (footballer, born 1989), Spanish football forward
Rubén Ramos (cyclist) (born 1992), Argentine cyclist
Rúben Ramos (footballer, born 1999), Portuguese football midfielder